Jason Shawn Alexander  or J. Alexander (born c. 1975) is a painter, illustrator and draftsman from Portland, Tennessee.

Alexander has produced illustrations for Dark Horse Comics, Warner Brothers, DC Comics, Hasbro, White Wolf, Inc, and Dalmatian Press.

His creator-owned Empty Zone was published for years by Sirius Entertainment. He also contributed to Poison Elves: Lusiphur and Linlith, also for Sirius Entertainment.

Brad Martin, a contributing writer with Juxtapoz magazine, describes Alexander's fine art pieces thus: "His gritty, drippy, and dark style lends an ominous air, like a fresh grave, and the subject's poses humanize the whole thing."

Alexander's work can be seen at Corey Helford Gallery in Los Angeles and 101/exhibit in Miami and New York.

Comics

Dark Horse Comics
Abe Sapien: The Drowning
Damnation
The Escapists
The Secret
Tales of the Vampires
Dark Horse: Twenty Years
Conan and the Midnight God (Covers)

Other
Crypt of Dawn
Gotham Central
Queen & Country: Operation Blackwall
Fear The Dead: A Zombie Survivor's Journal
Poison Elves: Lusiphur and Lirilith
Poison Elves Sketchbook
Van Helsing: From Beneath the Rue Morgue
Mikanno: A Sketchbook One Hundred Pages Circa 2002-2004
Dead Irons (with James Kuhoric, 5-issue mini-series, Dynamite Entertainment, Ongoing)
 "The Raven", in Mouse Guard: Legends of the Guard, volume 1, issue 3 (2010), an adaptation of Edgar Allan Poe's poem The Raven.

References

External links

101/exhibit

"The Wizard Q&A: Jason Shawn Alexander", WizardUniverse.com, 12 February 2008
Dowdy, Dru (Head of Publications). "The Outwin Boochever Portrait Competition 2009." Washington, D.C.: Smithsonian National Portrait Gallery, 2009.
 Blood and Whiskey
101/exhibit
 Skullsaw.com
 Studio Section Eight
"Episode 24: Abe Sapien with Jason Shawn Alexander", Comixology, March 31, 2008.  Accessed 1 September 2008.

1970s births
Living people
20th-century American painters
20th-century American male artists
American male painters
21st-century American painters
21st-century American male artists
American illustrators
American comics artists
People from Portland, Tennessee